The 1974 Georgia Bulldogs football team represented the University of Georgia during the 1974 NCAA Division I football season.

Schedule

Roster

Game summaries

Oregon State

References

Georgia
Georgia Bulldogs football seasons
Georgia Bulldogs football